Troels Jørgensen is a Danish mathematician at Columbia University working on hyperbolic geometry and complex analysis, who proved Jørgensen's inequality. He wrote his thesis in 1970 at the University of Copenhagen under the joint supervision of Werner Fenchel and Bent Fuglede.

Work
He is known for Jørgensen's inequality, and for his discovery of a hyperbolic structure on certain fibered 3-manifolds which were one of the inspirations for William Thurston's Geometrisation Conjecture. He is also credited with being one of the co-discoverers of the ordered structure of the set of volumes of hyperbolic 3-manifolds.

References

External resources

Danish mathematicians
Living people
Year of birth missing (living people)
Place of birth missing (living people)
Columbia University faculty